The FIS Snowboarding World Championships 2003 took place between January 13th and January 19th in Kreischberg, Austria.

Results

Men's Results

Snowboard Cross
The Snowboard Cross finals took place on January 19.

Parallel Giant Slalom
Parallel Giant Slalom finals took place on January 13.

Parallel Slalom
The Parallel Slalom finals took place on January 14.

Halfpipe
The finals took place on January 17.

Big Air
Big Air finals took place on January 18.

Women's Events

Snowboard Cross
The Snowboard Cross finals took place on January 19.

Parallel Giant Slalom
Parallel Giant Slalom finals took place on January 13.

Parallel Slalom
The Parallel Slalom finals took place on January 15.

Halfpipe
The finals took place on January 16.

Medal table

References

2003
2003 in Austrian sport
2003 in snowboarding